Paraguay is a nation that has competed at the Hopman Cup tennis tournament on one occasion, at the 15th annual staging of the tournament in 2003, when they lost to Uzbekistan in the qualification play-off.

Players
This is a list of players who have played for China in the Hopman Cup.

Results

References

Hopman Cup teams
Hopman Cup
Hopman Cup